The 1932 Grand National was the 91st renewal of the Grand National horse race that took place at Aintree Racecourse near Liverpool, England, on 18 March 1932.

The race was won by Forbra at odds of 50/1. The seven-year-old was ridden by jockey Tim Hamey and trained by Tom Rimell.

Egremont finished in second place, Shaun Goilin was third and Near East fourth. Thirty-six horses ran and all returned safely to the stables.

Edward, Prince of Wales was in attendance at Aintree for the showpiece steeplechase.

Finishing order

Non-finishers

References

 1932
Grand National
Grand National
20th century in Lancashire